Toolondo is a locality in western Victoria, Australia. The locality is adjacent to Toolondo Reservoir.

References

External links

Towns in Victoria (Australia)
Rural City of Horsham